The Little Duke (German: Der kleine Herzog) is a 1924 German silent film directed by Rudolf Walther-Fein and starring Carl Wallauer, Paul Biensfeldt and Lia Eibenschütz.

Cast
 Carl Wallauer as Herzog Milan
 Paul Biensfeldt as Kammerherr von Kruczicz 
 Lia Eibenschütz as Gräfin Helena 
 Maria Fein as Fürstin Katharina 
 Dora Friese as Irma 
 Olga Limburg as Fräulein von Jonescu 
 Hedwig Pauly-Winterstein as Frau von Trucschicz 
 Hans Peter Peterhans as Der kleine Graf Peter 
 Hermann Picha as Hofmeister 
 Robert Scholz as Erbprinz Boris 
 Kurt Vespermann as Leutnant Alexander 
 Eduard von Winterstein as Oberst von Trucschicz

References

Bibliography
 Bock, Hans-Michael & Bergfelder, Tim. The Concise CineGraph. Encyclopedia of German Cinema. Berghahn Books, 2009.

External links

1924 films
Films of the Weimar Republic
Films directed by Rudolf Walther-Fein
German silent feature films
German black-and-white films